Sharon Thesen (born 1946 in Tisdale, Saskatchewan) is a Canadian poet who lives in Lake Country, British Columbia.  She teaches at University of British Columbia Okanagan.

In 2003, Thesen was a judge for the Griffin Poetry Prize.

Selected works
 Artemis Hates Romance, Toronto: Coach House Press, 1980
 Radio New France Radio, Vancouver: Slug Press, 1981
 Holding the Pose, Toronto: Coach House Press, 1983
 Confabulations, Fernie, BC: Oolichan Books, 1984 (nominated for a Governor General's Award)
 The Beginning of the Long Dash, Toronto: Coach House Press, 1987 (nominated for a Governor General's Award)
 The Pangs of Sunday, Toronto: McClelland & Stewart, 1990
 Aurora, Vancouver: Talonbooks, 1995
 News and Smoke: Selected Poems, Vancouver: Talonbooks, 1999
 A Pair of Scissors, Toronto: House of Anansi Press, 2000 (winner of the Pat Lowther Award)
 Weeping Willow, Vancouver: Nomados, 2005
 The Good Bacteria, Toronto: House of Anansi Press, 2006 (nominated for the 2006 Governor General's Award for poetry and the Dorothy Livesay Poetry Prize)
 Oyama Pink Shale, Toronto: House of Anansi Press, 2011
 The Receiver, Vancouver: New Star Books, 2017
The Wig-Maker w/Janet Gallant, Vancouver: New Star Books, 2021

References

External links
Griffin Poetry Prize biography
Records of Sharon Thesen are held by Simon Fraser University's Special Collections and Rare Books

1946 births
Living people
20th-century Canadian poets
21st-century Canadian poets
Canadian women poets
20th-century Canadian women writers
21st-century Canadian women writers